Gary Sittler (March 14, 1952 – February 24, 2015) was a Canadian professional ice hockey defenceman.

During the 1974–75 season, Sittler played five games in the World Hockey Association with the Michigan Stags/Baltimore Blades.

Family
He was the younger brother of the Hockey Hall of Famer Darryl Sittler.

References

External links

1952 births
2015 deaths
Canadian ice hockey defencemen
Baltimore Blades players
London Knights players
Michigan Stags players
Saginaw Gears players
Suncoast Suns (EHL) players